John Owen Jones may refer to:

John Owen-Jones (born 1971), Welsh actor and singer
John Owen Jones (Ap Ffarmwr) (1861–1899), Welsh journalist
John Owen Jones (footballer) (1871–1955), Welsh footballer

See also
Jon Owen Jones (born 1954), Welsh politician
John Jones (disambiguation)